Priestley Sixth Form and Community College is a sixth form college in the Wilderspool district of Warrington, Cheshire, England. It also offers adult courses and professional training on another site, and is an associate college of the University of Salford. The college offers a range of courses, including AS/A2 Levels, BTECs, Advanced Diplomas, functional skills, and pre-university foundation courses.

History
The college opened in 1979, though it was originally a female-only grammar school called Warrington Girls' High School (and later Warrington High School for Girls) until 1974, and was administered by Warrington Education Committee. It was addressed as being on Menin Avenue until 1998, when it became administered by Warrington borough, previously being under Cheshire Education Committee.

The college's current name is in honour of clergyman, chemist, and educator Joseph Priestley (1733–1804), a pioneer in teaching modern history and the sciences who is perhaps best known for discovering oxygen in 1774. He was a Protestant dissenter who help establish the reputation of Warrington Academy in 1751. A statue of him now stands inside the main entrance of the college.

Structure
It is a single campus college with seven buildings:

 The Priestley Building holds the Viola Beach cafe, administrative facilities, and finance department, as well as classrooms for graphics, biology, chemistry, physics, performing arts, and modern foreign languages.
 The Art Centre, completed in 2013, provides spare classrooms for creative art, textiles, and computer graphic design.
 The Design Centre holds classrooms for 3D design and woodworking.
 The Sports Centre has sports halls and resources for sports and physical education.
 The Learning Resource Centre houses offices, the library, communal computers, and open-plan teaching areas.
 The Crescent Building, completed in 2007, holds student services, reception, and personnel, as well as classrooms for the departments of humanities, English, public services, law, business studies, religious studies, accounting, geography, and geology.
 The Lewis Carroll building, completed in 2014, holds rooms for ICT.

Academic performance
In 2007, the college was ranked "Outstanding" after an Ofsted inspection.

In 2016, 89% of those graduating stayed in education or employment for at least two terms after studying at A level or level 3 vocational courses. 3.5% of students achieved AAB or higher in at least two facilitating subjects at A level, 12.7% below the national average.

In 2018, the A* to B pass rate at the college was 38.2% and 68% of vocational grades were Distinction or Distinction*.

Transport connections
The college is an approximately 20 minute walk from the town centre.

Cheshire Cat Buses serve Wilderspool Causeway, which passes the college. Services operate to Warrington Bus Interchange and in the opposite direction to Altrincham, Grappenhall, Hatton, Northwich, and Stockton Heath. These services combine to provide buses from the college to the Bus Interchange and Stockton Heath every 10 minutes. The service 62 operates to Runcorn Shopping City and Warrington Bus Interchange in the opposite direction. This route is operated jointly between Warrington's Own Buses and Halton Transport.

The College also operates its own buses for students in conjunction with Warrington's Own Buses:

P1 - Helsby and Runcorn via Daresbury
P2 - Great Sankey, Hough Green, Penketh, and Widnes
P5 - Cadishead, Hollins Green, Irlam, and Woolston
P6 - Golborne, Leigh, Lowton, Newton-le-Willows, and Winwick
18 - Burtonwood and Westbrook
19 - Croft, Culcheth, and Winwick
25 - Birchwood

Services 18, 19, and 25 are regular passenger services that see their routes extended at certain times so that they originate or terminate at Priestley College rather than Warrington Interchange. From the 2018/19 academic year, services P3 and P4 were removed. The P4 was replaced by services 19 and 25.

References

External links
 Priestley College official website
 Priestley Training Services
 EduBase

Buildings and structures in Warrington
Education in Warrington
Learning and Skills Beacons
Educational institutions established in 1979
Sixth form colleges in Cheshire
1979 establishments in England